is a Japanese long jumper. In 2019, he competed in the men's long jump at the 2019 World Athletics Championships held in Doha, Qatar. He did not qualify to compete in the final.

In 2019, he also competed in the men's long jump at the 2019 Summer Universiade held in Naples, Italy. He did not qualify to compete in the final. In 2020, he won the gold medal in his event at the 2020 Japan Championships in Athletics held in 
Niigata, Japan.

References

External links 
 

Living people
1998 births
Place of birth missing (living people)
Japanese male long jumpers
Competitors at the 2019 Summer Universiade
World Athletics Championships athletes for Japan
Japan Championships in Athletics winners
Athletes (track and field) at the 2020 Summer Olympics
Olympic athletes of Japan